Augustin Bubník (21 November 1928 – 18 April 2017) was a Czech ice hockey player for the Czechoslovak national team. He won a silver medal at the 1948 Winter Olympics. He also played in the 1947 and 1949 World Championships, of which Czechoslovakia won both. He later worked as an ice hockey coach and was elected as an MP to the lower chamber of the Czech Parliament from the Civic Democratic Party. He also worked as the ice hockey coach of the Finnish National Team from 1966 to 1969, and was later inducted into the Finnish Hockey Hall of Fame.

Biography

Early life
Augustin Bubník was born on the 21 November 1928 in Czechoslovakia, now the Czech Republic. He grew up in Prague and played hockey for the LTC Praha Sports club. In 1947, he became a member of the Czechoslovakia national hockey team. The team won silver at the 1948 Winter Olympics in Saint-Moritz, Switzerland. In 1949, the team became World Champions.

Life under Communism
After the Czechoslovak National Hockey Team won the World Championship in 1949, the following year they were forced to give up their spot in the championship. State Security arrested all of the hockey team members, including Bubník. A trial with fabricated charges was brought against the entire team in 1950. Bubník was convicted of "treason", "subversion of the state" and "espionage". He was then sentenced to fourteen years in prison. He served time in a variety of prisons and in the uranium mines in the Jáchymov district and in Bytíz. President Zápotocký granted him amnesty and he was released in January 1955. Afterwards, the Regime only allowed him to play in the minor hockey leagues, so he turned to coaching.

In the mid- to late-1960s, Bubník managed to move to Finland, where he coached the Finnish National Team. He also helped develop hockey in general in Finland as well. In 1968, Bubník was officially rehabilitated, and in 1989, he finally received full social recognition.

Death and legacy
In 2004, Bubník was inducted into the Finnish Hockey Hall of Fame. In the early 2000s, he was interviewed by the non-profit Post Bellum for their Stories of the 20th Century Project. Bubník died on 18 April 2017, at the age of 88.

References

External links

1928 births
2017 deaths
Civic Democratic Party (Czech Republic) MPs
Czech sportsperson-politicians
Czechoslovak ice hockey coaches
Czechoslovak ice hockey forwards
Finland men's national ice hockey team coaches
Ice hockey players at the 1948 Winter Olympics
Medalists at the 1948 Winter Olympics
Members of the Chamber of Deputies of the Czech Republic (1998–2002)
Olympic ice hockey players of Czechoslovakia
Olympic medalists in ice hockey
Olympic silver medalists for Czechoslovakia
People convicted of treason against Czechoslovakia
Recipients of Medal of Merit (Czech Republic)
Ice hockey people from Prague
Czech ice hockey forwards
Czech ice hockey coaches
Czechoslovak expatriate sportspeople in Finland
Czechoslovak expatriate sportspeople in Austria